Dargah (also Romanized as Dargāh; also known as Dargāh-e Bālā and Dehgah) is a village in Dehshal Rural District, in the Central District of Astaneh-ye Ashrafiyeh County, Gilan Province, Iran. At the 2006 census, its population was 1,059, in 354 families.

References 

Populated places in Astaneh-ye Ashrafiyeh County